Torrecilla del Rebollar is a municipality located in the province of Teruel, Aragon, Spain. According to the 2004 census (INE), the municipality has a population of 178 inhabitants.

It is located in the Sierra de Cucalón area.

See also
Jiloca Comarca

References

Municipalities in the Province of Teruel